Athens High School is a public high school located in Athens, Texas, United States and classified as a 4A school by the UIL.  It is part of the Athens Independent School District located in central Henderson County.  In 2015, the school was rated "Met Standard" by the Texas Education Agency.

The school was rebuilt in the 1950s because it burned down after being set fire by a student.  The male student purposely lit the curtains in the gymnasium on fire, resulting in the whole building burning down.

Fine Arts
Band
The Athens High School Band competes in conference 4A. The band specializes in military style marching which is based on tradition with dignity and pride. The band marches at all Athens High School football games, UIL Marching contest and at local parades. During the spring semester, they perform several concerts and participate in UIL Concert and Sightreading contest
The band has been awarded the UIL "Sweepstakes" award for earning 1st division ratings in marching, concert and in sightreading competitions for the past 11 consecutive years 
The band most recently performed in Washington D.C. and has also performed at Universal Studios, Walt Disney World and in Chicago at the Field Museum.
Through 2017, the band under the direction of Rusty Lay has earned Sweepstakes awards for 12 consecutive years.

Athletics
The Athens Hornets compete in these sports - 

Cross Country, Volleyball, Football, Basketball, Powerlifting, Soccer, Golf, Tennis, Track, Softball & Baseball

State titles
Boys Basketball - 
1927(All), 1929(All), 1931(All), 1933(All), 1934(All)
1929 (National), 1930 (National)
Boys Golf - 
1956(1A), 1974(3A)
Prose Interpretation
Dylan Godwin 2002(4A) 
Adam Gibbs 2004(4A)
One Act Play 
2009(3A)
Policy Debate - 
2014 (3A)- Meridith Mcdonald and Madalyn Mikkelsen
2015, 2016, 2017 (4A)- Matthew Hernandez and True Head
Congressional Debate
2017 (4A)- Matthew Hernandez
Persuasive Speaking
2017 (4A)- Michael Pulver

Notable alumni
Duke Carlisle (Class of 1959), former college football player at the University of Texas
Adam Gibbs, actor
Terrence McGee, former NFL player
Barron Tanner, former NFL player

Internet
Athens High School has a Dedicated line network connection from Suddenlink Communications. This allows sharing of information and computer network resource between campuses with Active Directory.

References

External links
 

Public high schools in Texas
Schools in Henderson County, Texas